A monopoly price is set by a monopoly. A monopoly occurs when a firm lacks any viable competition and is the sole producer of the industry's product. Because a monopoly faces no competition, it has absolute market power and can set a price above the firm's marginal cost.  

The monopoly ensures a monopoly price exists when it establishes the quantity of the product. As the sole supplier of the product within the market, its sales establish the entire industry's supply within the market, and the monopoly's production and sales decisions can establish a single price for the industry without any influence from competing firms. The monopoly always considers the demand for its product as it considers what price is appropriate, such that it chooses a production supply and price combination that ensures a maximum economic profit, which is determined by ensuring that the marginal cost (determined by the firm's technical limitations that form its cost structure) is the same as the marginal revenue (MR) (as determined by the impact a change in the price of the product will impact the quantity demanded) at the quantity it decides to sell. The marginal revenue is solely determined by the demand for the product within the industry and is the change in revenue that will occur by lowering the price just enough to ensure a single additional unit is sold. The marginal revenue is positive, but it is lower than its associated price because lowering the price will increase the demand for its product and increase the firm's sales revenue, and lower the price paid by those who are willing to buy the product at the higher price, which ensures a lower sales revenue on the product sales than those willing to pay the higher price.
Marginal cost (MC) relates to the firm's technical cost structure within production, and indicates the rise in total cost that must occur for an additional unit to be supplied to the market by the firm. The marginal cost is higher than the average cost because of diminishing marginal product in the short run.
Samuelson indicates this point on the consumer demand curve is where the price is equal to one over one plus the reciprocal of the price elasticity of demand. This rule does not apply to competitive firms, as they are price takers and do not have the market power to control either prices or industry-wide sales.

Although the term markup is sometimes used in economics to refer to the difference between a monopoly price and the monopoly's MC, it is frequently used in American accounting and finance to define the difference between the price of the product and its per unit accounting cost. Accepted neo-classical micro-economic theory indicates the American accounting and finance definition of markup, as it exists in most competitive markets, ensures an accounting profit that is just enough to solely compensate the equity owners of a competitive firm within a competitive market for the economic cost (opportunity cost) they must bear if they hold on to the firm's equity. The economic cost of holding onto equity at its present value is the opportunity cost the investor must bear when giving up the interest earnings on debt of similar present value (they hold onto equity instead of the debt). Economists would indicate that a markup rule on economic cost used by a monopoly to set a monopoly price that will maximize its profit is excessive markup that leads to inefficiencies within an economic system.

Mathematical derivation: how a monopoly sets the monopoly price

Mathematically, the general rule a monopoly uses to maximize monopoly profit can be derived through simple calculus. The basic equation for economic profit, in which the total economic cost varies directly with the quantity produced, can be expressed as

, where
  = quantity sold,
  = inverse demand function; the price at which  can be sold given the existing demand
  = total cost of producing .
  = economic profit
The profit of a firm is given by total revenue (price times quantity sold) minus total cost:

, where
  = quantity sold,
  = the partial derivative of the inverse demand function, and the price at which  can be sold given the existing demand
  = marginal cost, or the partial derivative of the total cost of producing 
which yields

where marginal revenue equals marginal cost. This is usually called the first order conditions for a profit maximum.

According to Samuelson,

By definition,  is the reciprocal of the price elasticity of demand (or ), or

This gives the markup rule:

or, letting  be the reciprocal of the price elasticity of demand,

Thus the monopolistic firm chooses the quantity at which the demand price satisfies this rule. Since  for a price setting firm, it means that a firm with market power will charge a price above marginal cost and earn a monopoly rent. On the other hand, a competitive firm by definition faces a perfectly elastic demand, which means that it sets price equal to marginal cost.

The rule also implies that, absent menu costs, a monopolistic firm will never choose a point on the inelastic portion of its demand curve. For an equilibrium to exist in a monopoly or in an oligopoly market, the price elasticity of demand must be less than negative one, for marginal revenue to be positive. The mathematical profit maximization conditions ("first order conditions") ensure the price elasticity of demand must be less than negative one, since no rational firm that attempts to maximize its profit would incur additional cost (a positive marginal cost) in order to reduce revenue (when MR < 0).

References

Financial economics